The 2016 Humpty's Champions Cup was held from April 26 to May 1 at the Sherwood Park Arena Sports Centre in Sherwood Park, Alberta. This was the final Grand Slam event of the 2015–16 curling season and is the seventh men's Grand Slam and the sixth women's Grand Slam of the season. The teams were split into 3 round-robin pools of 5 teams each, and the top eight teams overall will qualify for the playoff round.

Teams from the Winnipeg area won both the men's and women's events, with Reid Carruthers winning his first slam as a skip on the men's side and Jennifer Jones winning her 12th slam on the women's side. Both Carruthers and Jones happened to qualify for the Champions Cup by winning the same event, the DeKalb Superspiel.

Men

Teams
The teams are listed as follows:

Round Robin Standings

Draw 1
Tuesday, April 26, 7:00 pm

Draw 2
Wednesday, April 27, 8:30 am

Draw 3
Wednesday, April 27, 12:00 pm

Draw 4
Wednesday, April 27, 3:30 pm

Draw 5
Wednesday, April 27, 7:30 pm

Draw 6
Thursday, April 28, 8:30 am

Draw 7
Thursday, April 28, 12:30 pm

Draw 8
Thursday, April 28, 4:00 pm

Draw 9
Thursday, April 28, 7:30 pm

Draw 10
Friday, April 29, 8:30 am

Draw 11
Friday, April 29, 12:30 pm

Draw 12
Friday, April 29, 4:00 pm

Draw 13
Friday, April 29, 7:30 pm

Tiebreakers
Saturday, April 30, 9:00 am

Playoffs

Quarterfinals
Saturday, April 30, 5:00 pm

Semifinals
Saturday, April 30, 8:30 pm

Final
Carruthers wins his first Slam as a skip in a rare second extra end.
Sunday, May 1, 6:00 pm

Women

Teams
The teams are listed as follows:

Round Robin Standings

Draw 1
Tuesday, April 26, 7:00 pm

Draw 2
Wednesday, April 27, 8:30 am

Draw 3
Wednesday, April 27, 12:00 pm

Draw 4
Wednesday, April 27, 3:30 pm

Draw 5
Wednesday, April 27, 7:30 pm

Draw 6
Thursday, April 28, 8:30 am

Draw 7
Thursday, April 28, 12:30 pm

Draw 8
Thursday, April 28, 4:00 pm

Draw 9
Thursday, April 28, 7:30 pm

Draw 10
Friday, April 29, 8:30 am

Draw 11
Friday, April 29, 12:30 pm

Draw 12
Friday, April 29, 4:00 pm

Tiebreaker
Friday, April 29, 7:30 pm

Playoffs

Quarterfinals
Saturday, April 30, 12:30 pm

Semifinals
Saturday, April 30, 8:30 pm

Final
Sunday, May 1, 2:30 pm

Qualification process
The Champions Cup will involve 15 men's and 15 women's winners on the Pinty's GSOC season plus champions from select events, including the Tim Hortons Brier, Scotties Tournament of Hearts, World/Regional Championships, and other highly ranked competitive events on the World Curling Tour.

The winning teams at the events listed below will receive invites to the Champions Cup.
For Men's Qualifying, the top 3 ranked WCT event winners will be invited.
For Women's Qualifying the top 4 ranked WCT event winners will be invited.

In the event a team wins more than one qualifying event (e.g. Team A wins the Masters and Canadian Open or wins multiple events including other WCT events), the winner of the next highest ranked World Curling Tour event based on Strength of Field Multiplier (SFM), that has not qualified through another path, will be invited to complete the 15-team lineup.

[Teams listed below under WCT Event will be updated as necessary/weekly based on qualifiers from other events and WCT events yet to be played that may have higher SFM ratings]

Men

WCT events ranked by Strength of field multiplier

Women

WCT events ranked by Strength of field multiplier

Notes

References

External links

Champions Cup (curling)
2016 in Canadian curling
Curling in Alberta
2016 in Alberta
Sherwood Park